The Burgos Symphony Orchestra (in Spanish, Orquesta Sinfónica de Burgos) was established in Burgos in 2005. Since then it has held a series of regular concerts at the Teatro Principal de Burgos.

The ensemble consists of musicians from Burgos and other parts of Spain.

External links 
 Orchestra page on MySpace

Spanish orchestras
Castilian music
Musical groups established in 2005